The 1951 Delaware State Hornets football team represented Delaware State College—now known as Delaware State University—as a member of the Central Intercollegiate Athletic Association (CIAA) in the 1951 college football season. Led by coach Willard S. Jones in his first year, the Hornets compiled a 2–7 record, being shut out four times and outscored 41 to 158.

Schedule

References

Delaware State
Delaware State Hornets football seasons
Delaware State Hornets football